The geography of Sydney is characterised by its coastal location on a basin bordered by the Pacific Ocean to the east, the Blue Mountains to the west, the Hawkesbury River to the north and the Woronora Plateau to the south. Sydney lies on a submergent coastline on the east coast of New South Wales, where the ocean level has risen to flood deep river valleys (rias) carved in the Sydney sandstone. Port Jackson, better known as Sydney Harbour, is one such ria.

The Sydney area lies on Triassic shales and sandstones. The region mostly consists of low rolling hills and wide valleys in a rain shadow area that is shielded by the Great Dividing Range. Sydney sprawls over two major regions: the Cumberland Plain, a relatively flat region lying to the west of Sydney Harbour, and the Hornsby Plateau, a plateau north of the Harbour rising to 200 metres and dissected by steep valleys. Sydney's native plant species are predominantly eucalyptus trees, and its soils are usually red and yellow in texture. The endemic flora is home to a variety of bird, insect, reptile and mammal species, which are conspicuous in urban areas.

There are more than 70 harbour and ocean beaches in the urban area. Most of Sydney's water storages are on tributaries of the Nepean River. Parramatta River drains a large area of Sydney's western suburbs.

Greater Sydney's boundaries stretch 88 kilometres (55 mi) from Palm Beach in the north to Waterfall in the south, and 70 kilometres (43 mi) from Bondi Beach in the east to Emu Plains in the west.

Geology

The rising sea level between 6,000 and 18,000 years ago flooded the rias to form estuaries and deep harbours. Erosion by coastal streams has created a landscape of deep canyons and remnant plateaus. The city has fault lines which run considerably deep beneath the Sydney basin, dating back to when New Zealand started breaking away from Australia more than 85 million years ago. To the east the basin continues to the edge of the continental shelf.

The sand that was to become the sandstone of today was washed from Broken Hill and laid down about 200 million years ago. The ripple marks from the ancient river that brought the grains of sand are distinctive and easily seen, telling geologists that the sand comes from rocks formed between 500 and 700 million years ago far to the south. This means that the highest part of the visible lines almost always faces approximately south. There are volcanic rocks from low hills in the shale landscapes. The Basin's sedimentary rocks have been subject to uplift with gentle folding and minor faulting during the formation of the Great Dividing Range.

At a time in the past, monocline formed to the west of Sydney. The monocline is a sloping bend that raises the sandstone well above where it is expected to be seen, and this is why the whole of the visible top of the Blue Mountains is made of sandstone. Sandstone slopes in the Sydney area are on three sides: to the west the Blue Mountains, and to the north and south, the Hornsby and Woronora plateaux'.

The sandstone was probably deposited in a freshwater delta and is the caprock which controls the erosion and scarp retreat of the Illawarra escarpment. Six kilometres of sandstone and shale lie under Sydney. Bringelly Shale and Minchinbury Sandstone are often seen in the greater western parts of Sydney. Ashfield Shale is observed in the inner western suburbs. These components are part of the Wianamatta Shale group. Mittagong Formation sighted in a few areas in northern Sydney.

The Prospect dolerite intrusion in western Sydney is the largest assemblage of igneous rock in Sydney. The oval-shaped ridge was made many millions of years ago when volcanic material from the Earth's upper mantle moved upwards and then sideways. Slow erosion of the overlying layers of sedimentary rock by the flow of rainwater have eventually laid bare the edges of the volcanic and metamorphic rocks of the intrusion. The Gap, an ocean cliff on the South Head peninsula in Watsons Bay, was laid as sediment more than 200 million years ago in the Triassic period. During the Jurassic era, a cataclysmic event resulted in an enormous crack forming within the strata. The Gap itself forms a sequence that continues offshore to the edge of the Sahul Shelf.

Sydney features two major soils; sandy soils (such as red, brown and yellow podsols, grey and brown tenosols, lithosols, kandosols and kurosols) which originate from the Hawkesbury sandstone and have low fertility, and clay soils (which are from shales and volcanic rocks), though some soils may be a mixture of the aforementioned soils (such as sandy clay loams and silty clay loam).

Sydney has a number of islands in its harbour and surrounding rivers. Such islands include, Shark Island, Cockatoo Island, Clark Island, Snapper Island, Spectacle Island and Goat Island in Port Jackson. Bare Island in Botany Bay. Lion Island, Long Island and Milson Island in Hawkesbury River. Scotland Island in the Northern Beaches. And Rodd Island in Parramatta River.

Rivers and creeks

Overall, Sydney has nine rivers and just over a hundred creeks. The Nepean River rises to the south in the Woronora Plateau, and wraps around the western edge of the city. Swamps and lagoons are existent on the floodplain of the Nepean River, one being Bents Basin, which is also a recreational area. Where the Nepean turns east it becomes the Hawkesbury River, which winds through the Hornsby Plateau before emptying into Broken Bay. Broken Bay and the lower Hawkesbury form the commonly accepted boundary between Sydney and the Central Coast to the north.

The south and southwest of Sydney is drained by the Georges River, flowing north from its source near Appin, towards Liverpool and then turning east towards Botany Bay. The other major tributary of Botany Bay is the Cooks River, running through the inner-south western suburbs of Canterbury and Tempe. The Georges River estuary separates the main part of Sydney's urban area from the Sutherland Shire. The Woronora River, on the southern edge of the Sydney Plain, flows in a steep-sided valley from the Woronora Dam to the eastern estuary of the Georges River. The Hacking River is further south and runs through The Royal National Park into Port Hacking which forms the southern boundary of the Sutherland Shire.

Parramatta River's headwaters are several local creeks including Toongabbie Creek and Hunts Creek, part of the upper Parramatta river catchment area. Duck River is the river's southern tributary. Hunt's creek flows from Lake Parramatta, a few kilometres North of Parramatta. At east Parramatta the river becomes a tidal estuary that flows into Port Jackson, commonly known as Sydney harbour. Other major tributaries flow into Port Jackson from the North Shore and are the Lane Cove River and Middle Harbour Creek.

Minor waterways draining Sydney's western suburbs include South Creek and Eastern Creek, flowing into the Hawkesbury, and Prospect Creek draining into the Georges River. Cowan Creek and Berowra Creek run north from the Upper North Shore to the Hawkesbury river.

Ecology

The predominant plant communities in the Sydney region are grassy woodlands, which are open woodlands scattered with sclerophyllous shrubs and sparse grass in the understory. Wet and dry sclerophyll forest exist in some pockets, with heathlands and temperate/subtropical rainforests occurring in a few areas as well, thus making the Sydney region have distinct biomes. Dry sclerophyll forests, reminiscent of Mediterranean forests, are the most widespread forest type in the region, which occur sporadically in the Cumberland Plain and would feature dry, eucalyptus woodland. On the other hand, wet sclerophyll forests, which fall under temperate forests, have narrow, relatively tall, dense trees with a lush, moist understorey of fleecy shrubs and tree ferns. They are found in the cooler, wetter areas such as Northern Suburbs, Forest District, North Shore and in the Blue Mountains.

Sclerophyll forests developed as a result of the extreme age of the continent combined with Aboriginal fire use. Deep weathering of the crust leached chemicals out of the rock, leaving Australian soils deficient in nutrients. The sandstone is the basis of the nutrient-poor soils found in Sydney that developed over millennia and 'came to nurture a brilliant and immensely diverse array of plants'. As plants cannot afford to lose leaves to herbivores when nutrients are scarce, they defend their foliage with toxins. In eucalypts, these toxins give the bush its distinctive smell. It has been calculated that around 98,000 hectares of native vegetation remains in the Sydney metropolitan area, about half of what is likely to have been existing at the time of European arrival.

The fauna of the Sydney area is diverse and its urban area is home to variety of bird and insect species, and also a few bat, arachnid and amphibian species. Sydney is home to dozens of bird species, which mainly include the Australian white ibis, Australian raven, Australian magpie, crested pigeon, grey butcherbird, magpie lark, noisy miner, pied currawong, silver gull and willie wagtail, among others. Introduced birds such as the house sparrow, common myna and feral pigeon are ubiquitous in the CBD areas of Sydney. Moreover, possums, bandicoots, rabbits, feral cats, lizards, snakes and frogs may also be present in the urban environment, albeit seldom in city centers.

Topography

The extensive area covered by urban Sydney is formally divided into more than 650 suburbs for addressing and postal purposes, and administered as 38 local government areas. The City of Sydney itself covers a fairly small area comprising the central business district and its neighbouring inner-city suburbs. The 151st meridian east passes through the western suburbs of Granville and Revesby, among others. The suburbs to the west of those lie on the eastern end of the 150th meridian, which is a line that passes through the Russian city of Magadan in the Northern Hemisphere.

The west side is bounded by Darling Harbour, a popular tourist and nightlife precinct while Central station marks the southern end of the CBD. George Street serves as the Sydney CBD's main north–south thoroughfare. The oldest parts of the city are located in the flat areas south of the harbour; the North Shore was slower to develop because of its hilly topography, and was mostly a quiet backwater until the Sydney Harbour Bridge was opened in 1932, linking it to the rest of the city, with the suburbs surrounding the northern entrance to said bridge effectively developing North Sydney into a second central business district.

The Eastern Suburbs sit on the coast of Sydney. They contain iconic beaches such as Bondi Beach and Coogee Beach, and feature prominent seaside cliffs. These suburbs are located in generally close proximity to the city centre and are serviced by rail networks. The landscape in these areas is characterized by winding crescent-like streets with harbourside beaches and villages.

The Northern Suburbs of Sydney are characterised by pristine waterways with immense greenery and large plots of manicured land. Most of the North Shore suburbs are part of the Hawkesbury Plateau, a large sandstone plateau overlaid by a system of hilly ridges and gullies. Major waterways in the region include the Parramatta River, Lane Cove River and the many creek systems that branch out from these. The region is home to many parks and nature reserves – The Lane Cove National Park and the Garigal National Park include many areas of remnant bushland adjacent to the Lane Cove River and Middle Harbour.

The Hills District, situated halfway between the northern suburbs and greater western Sydney, is a region so named for its characteristically comparatively hilly topography, akin to the Northern Suburbs and North Shore. Several of its suburbs have the word 'Hills' in their names. As such, its elevation creates orographic rainfall brought in by onshore winds from the Pacific Ocean.

The western suburbs predominantly lie on the Cumberland Plain and are relatively flat in contrast to the above regions. They are situated on a rain shadow, thanks to the Hills District to the northeast. Thus, they tend to be drier than the coast and less lush than the hilly Northern Suburbs. Agriculture is mainly concentrated in the outskirts of the Greater Western Sydney area, such as in suburbs of Kemps Creek, Orchard Hills, Luddenham and Horsley Park, among others, which lie in a countryside.

According to the Senseable City Lab at the Massachusetts Institute of Technology (MIT), which measures canopy cover in the world's most prominent cities, the Sydney area had a Green View Index of 25.9% – This represents the total percentage of the city covered by urban trees. Tying with Vancouver at that percentage, Sydney is the third prominent city in the world with the most trees after Singapore and Oslo, respectively.

Recreational areas

The Sydney CBD contains prominent parks such as, Hyde Park, The Domain and Royal Botanic Gardens and Farm Cove on the harbour. Other parks in that vicinity include Wynyard and Hyde Park. The Royal Botanic Gardens is the most important green space in the Sydney region, hosting both scientific and leisure activities. There are 15 separate parks under the administration of the City of Sydney.

It is regarded for its well-preserved records of indigenous habitation and more than 800 rock engravings, cave drawings, and middens have been located in the park. The Domain is the oldest public parkland in Australia and measures  in area. Its location was used for both relaxation and the grazing of animals from the earliest days of the colony.

The inner west suburbs include Centennial Park and Moore Park in the east, Sydney Park and Royal National Park in the south, Ku-ring-gai Chase National Park in the north, and Western Sydney Parklands in the west. Other major parks in the Sydney metropolitan area include Auburn Botanical Gardens, Central Gardens Nature Reserve, Heathcote National Park, Georges River National Park, Lane Cove National Park and Blue Mountains National Park. There are large parks and reserves surrounding prominent bodies of water, such as those around Prospect Reservoir, Chipping Norton Lake, Lake Parramatta and Nepean River (Bents Basin).

Sydney has some of the finest and most famous beaches in the world. There are well over 100 beaches in the city, ranging in size from a few metres to several kilometres, located along the city's Pacific Ocean coastline and its harbours, bays and rivers. With around 70 surf beaches and dozens of harbour coves, Sydney is almost unrivalled in the world for the number and quality of beaches available. The water and sand among the city beaches, despite their popularity, are remarkably clean. The beach watch program was established in 1989 in response to community concern about the impact of sewage pollution on human health and the environment at Sydney's ocean beaches.

Regions

There are a number of informal regional names describing large sections of the urban area. Not all suburbs are necessarily covered by any of the following informal regional categories.

The regions are Canterbury-Bankstown, the Eastern Suburbs, the Forest District, Greater Western Sydney, the Hills District, the Inner West, the Macarthur region, the Northern Beaches, the Northern Suburbs, the North Shore, Southern Sydney, South Western Sydney, the St George district, the Sutherland Shire and Western Sydney. The Blue Mountains are at times considered to be part of Sydney's metropolitan area.

The largest commercial centres outside of the CBD are North Sydney and Chatswood in the north, Parramatta to the west, Liverpool in the south-west, Hurstville in the south and Bondi Junction to the east. There has been accelerating commercial development in Parramatta since the 1950s as firms serving Western Sydney have set up regional offices and recognised the region's significant residential population mass and cheaper rents.

Climate

Sydney has a humid subtropical climate (Cfa) with warm, sometimes hot summers, and winters shifting from mild to cool. Although Sydney is predominantly humid subtropical, the hilly wet areas in the North Shore, Northern Suburbs, Forest District and Hills District have an oceanic climate (Cfb). The weather is moderated by proximity to the ocean, and more extreme temperatures are recorded in the inland western suburbs.

In late spring and summer, Sydney can sometimes get northwesterly winds from the Outback, which are dry and hot, making the temperatures reach above . Frost is oftentimes observed in the outer suburbs.

Rainfall is spread throughout the year, but is slightly higher during the first half of the year when easterly winds dominate. Australian east coast low brings large amounts of rain in late autumn and winter.

See also
Sydney basin
Geology of New South Wales
Geology of Australia
Cumberland Plain Woodland
Sydney sandstone
Bald Hill Claystone
Geography of Australia
Geography of New South Wales
List of beaches in Sydney

References

Sources

External links
 Map of Sydney suburbs from Dictionary of Sydney
 Regional Plan for Sydney 
 Geology of the Sydney Basin
 Triassic Rocks of Sydney
 Sydney Metropolitan Vegetation
 Urban Forest Strategy
 Wildlife of Sydney
 Birds of Sydney

 
Geology of New South Wales
Biogeography of New South Wales
Environment of Australia
Sydney